The Sporting club mazamétain is a French rugby union club based a Mazamet. It's playing en Fédérale 1.

The higher point in the history of club was the year 1958, when, arrived in the French rugby union championship, losing against Lourdes, but winning the Coupe of France beating Mont-de-Marsan in the finale.

Palmares 

French rugby union championship of 1ère division

 Finalist (1) : 1958

French rugby union championship of 2nd division

 Champion (1) : 1985

Challenge Yves du Manoir
 Winner (1) : 1958
 Finalist (1) : 1955

External links 
 Official Site

Mazamet
Mazamet
1905 establishments in France